México, México is a compilation album recorded for Mexico's soccer team that competed in the 2006 FIFA World Cup in Germany. The album was released on May 16, 2006 and contains the official song of the Mexican soccer team "México, México" by RBD.

Track listing

2006 compilation albums
Compilation albums by Mexican artists
EMI Records compilation albums